Duf Falls near the village of Rostuša is located in Mavrovo National Park in the western region of North Macedonia.  The waterfall is located near the Saint Jovan Bigorski Monastery.

References 
Evans, Thammy: Macedonia, p. 308

Waterfalls of North Macedonia
Mavrovo and Rostuša Municipality